The 1964 Barnet Council election took place on 7 May 1964 to elect members of Barnet London Borough Council in London, England. The whole council was up for election and the Conservative party  gained control of the council.

These elections were the first to the newly formed borough. Previously elections had taken place in the Municipal Borough of Finchley, Municipal Borough of Hendon, Barnet Urban District, East Barnet Urban District and Friern Barnet Urban District. These boroughs and districts were joined to form the new London Borough of Barnet by the London Government Act 1963.

A total of 175 candidates stood in the election for the 56 seats being contested across 30 wards. These included a full slate from the Conservative and Labour parties, while the Liberals stood at least one candidate in each ward. Other candidates included 7 from the Communist party and 1 independent. There were 13 three-seat wards (the former boroughs of Finchley and Hendon) and 17 one-seat wards (the former urban districts of Barnet, East Barnet and Friern Barnet).

This election also had aldermen as well as directly elected councillors.  The Conservatives got 6 aldermen, Labour 2 and the Liberals 1.

The Council was elected in 1964 as a "shadow authority" but did not start operations until 1 April 1965.

Election result
The results saw the Conservatives gain the new council with a majority of 24 after winning 37 of the 56 seats. Overall turnout in the election was 46.1%. This turnout included 1,332 postal votes.

|}

Ward results

Arkley East

Arkley West

Barnet North

Barnet South

Brunswick Park

Burnt Oak

Childs Hill

Cockfosters

East Barnet

Edgware

Finchley Central

Finchley East

Finchley North

Finchley West

Friern Barnet Central

Friern Barnet East

Friern Barnet North

Friern Barnet South

Friern Barnet West

Garden Suburb

Golders Green

Hadley

Hendon Central

Lyonsdown

Mill Hill

New Barnet

Osidge

Park

Totteridge

West Hendon

By-elections between 1964 and 1968
There were no by-elections.

References

1964
1964 London Borough council elections